Loch Chon is a freshwater loch situated west of the village of Aberfoyle, near the small village of Kinlochard, Stirling, Scotland, UK. Loch Chon lies upstream of Loch Ard and to the south of Loch Katrine.

In the past, Loch Chon was known as Loch-a-Choin - loch of the dog/dogs. Choin is the Scots Gaelic word for dog in its genitive case (coin), lenited because loch is a masculine noun, causing an 'h' to be placed after the 'c'.

Loch Chon itself is fed by several small streams which can be considered to be the true sources of the River Forth.

There are three islands in the loch. Two are unnamed, including the largest, which is roughly 315 feet/96 metres long. The medium sized island is called Heron Island and is roughly 230 feet/70 metres long.

Geology

According to Ben Peach and John Horne, published in the 1910 Bathymetrical survey of the Scottish fresh-water lochs, Loch Chon is a striking example of a rock basin. The upper portion of the lake is floored by mica-schists, and the lower portion by Ben Ledi grits and schistose epidotic grits ("Green Beds"), the members of the two latter groups being repeated by sharp folds. The trend of the loch — N.N.W. and S.S.E. — is oblique to the strike of the strata.

This feature coincides with a line of fault that crosses the loch in a north-east and south-west direction, its downthrow being to the south-east. There is ground for the belief that nearly the whole of the basin bounded by the  contour-line is floored by mica-schist.

The shallowing of the basin here takes place along the outcrop of very massive epidotic grits ("Green Beds") several glaciated rocky islands appearing along this line. Southwards to the mouth of the lake there are alternations of Ben Ledi grits and schistose epidotic grits, the narrowest parts of the lake coinciding with the exposures of the latter group.

Across the mouth of this basin a band of massive, pebbly grits of the Ben Ledi type has been traced.

The direction of the ice-flow during the great glaciation coincides generally with the trend of the loch, striae being found on the rocky islands as well as round the margin of the lake. The evidence supplied by soundings tends to support the theory that the basin-shaped hollow has been eroded by ice-action. The dislocations referred to above have doubtless produced local modifications of the floor of Loch Chon and Loch Dhu, but they do not account for the excavation of the basin.

Camping

The north and east sides of Loch Chon fall within one of Loch Lomond and the Trossachs National Park's camping management zones, established by the introduction of byelaws in 2017. This means that, between March and September of each year, wild camping is not allowed within 200 metres of the shore line.

However, the west shore of Loch Chon and its islands are not within the camping management zone. Therefore, wild camping is allowed there, provided the other byelaws, such as that prohibiting gathering dead wood, and the Scottish Outdoor Access Code, are followed.

There is a campsite run by the Loch Lomond and the Trossachs National Park on the east side of the loch, open from March through to September. This was established in 2017, as part of the provisions in the byelaws that they provide affordable camping opportunities.

References

External links

Standing Waters Database - Loch Chon
UK Lakes Portal - Loch Chon

Chon
Chon
LChon